Sel is a municipality in Innlandet county, Norway. It is located in the traditional district of Gudbrandsdal. The administrative centre of the municipality is the town of Otta. The municipality also includes several notable villages including Bjølstad, Dale, Høvringen, Nord-Sel, Sandbumoen, Sjoa, and Skogbygda.

The  municipality is the 130th largest by area out of the 356 municipalities in Norway. Sel is the 172nd most populous municipality in Norway with a population of 5,531.

General information
The new municipality of Sel was established on 1 January 1908 when Vågå Municipality was divided into three. The northeastern part became the new Sel Municipality (population: 2,287), the southeastern part became the new Heidal Municipality (population: 1,241) and the western part continued as Vågå Municipality (population: 2,953). During the 1960s, there were many municipal mergers across Norway due to the work of the Schei Committee. On 1 January 1965, the municipality of Heidal (population: 1,731) was dissolved and it was merged with the neighboring municipality of Sel (population: 3,687) along with the Tolstadåsen area of Vågå Municipality (population: 35) and the Sjoa area of Nord-Fron Municipality (population: 413) to form a new, larger Sel Municipality.

Name
The municipality (originally the parish) is named after the old Sel farm, since the first Sel Church was built there. This farm is located in the present-day village of Nord-Sel. The name is identical with the word sil which means "slowly running and quiet part of a river" (here meaning the Gudbrandsdalslågen river).

Coat of arms
The coat of arms was granted on 18 May 1985. The arms show a gold-colored girl playing a trumpet on a blue background. The image is based on the local Prillar-Guri legend. In 1612, a Scottish army marched through the area on its way to Sweden. They were stopped by the local farmers at the Battle of Kringen. The legend tells that the farmers were warned for the Scots by a local girl with a trumpet.

Churches
The Church of Norway has three parishes within the municipality of Sel. It is part of the Nord-Gudbrandsdal prosti (deanery) in the Diocese of Hamar.

Government
All municipalities in Norway, including Sel, are responsible for primary education (through 10th grade), outpatient health services, senior citizen services, unemployment and other social services, zoning, economic development, and municipal roads.  The municipality is governed by a municipal council of elected representatives, which in turn elects a mayor.  The municipality falls under the Vestre Innlandet District Court and the Eidsivating Court of Appeal.

Municipal council
The municipal council  of Sel is made up of 25 representatives that are elected to four year terms.  The party breakdown of the council is as follows:

Mayors
The mayors of Sel (incomplete list):

Geography

Sel is bordered on the north by Dovre and Vågå municipalities, and on the south by Nord-Fron municipality. To the northeast it is bordered by Folldal municipality. Large parts of the very first national park in Norway, Rondane National Park is situated in the municipality of Sel and has its main entrances from the mountain villages of Høvringen and Mysuseter. The Jutulhogget canyon is located in the park.

Although it has a small population, Sel is one of the more scenic and historically significant areas of the Gudbrandsdalen valley. A large concentration of Norway's heritage-listed farms are located in the Heidal valley in Sel municipality (Heidal became part of Sel municipality in 1965).

The town of Otta, named after the Otta River, is the main population center in the municipality. Otta lies at the point where the Otta River joins the Gudbrandsdalslågen river from the west. The Otta River leads up to the historically important Vågå and Lom regions and the passes to the west into the Jotunheimen mountain range.

Attractions
Jørundgard Medieval Center - This reconstructed 14th century medieval farm, the location of Sigrid Undset's novel "Kristin Lavransdatter", was the site of a 1994 filming of Kransen. The buildings were furnished in medieval style for the film. It is open to the public and traditional crafts are demonstrated by staff, providing a uniquely medieval look at Norwegian history.
Pilgrim's Route/Old Kings Road - The Pilgrim's Route and Old King's Road passes through Sel on its way through the Gudbrand Valley and northwards over Dovrefjell mountains near present-day Dombås in the Dovre municipality.
Selsverket - Sel municipality has a long tradition in mining and quarrying for minerals, soapstone, and slate. Selsverket was the copper works from the 18th century which was located approximately 2 kilometers north of Otta. There were also copper works in neighboring Folldal.
Sel Church - The church at Selsverket was built in 1742. It is constructed of logs.
Steinberget Fortress - Built in the pre-Christian period, the Steinberget fortress is now a jumble of rock along European route E6.
Kringen - In 1612, a peasant militia ambushed Scots marching to support Sweden at Kringen (the narrowest part of the Gudbrand Valley, just below the confluence of the Otta and the Gudbrandsdalslågen). As the Scots reached the ambush site of Prillarguri hill, legend has it that Prillar-Guri, riding on the other side of the lågen, distracted the Scots until they were in the right position. She then sounded a blast with her prillarhorn (a ram's horn), and the Battle of Kringen began.  A monument can be found there today, and she's also found on Sel's coat-of-arms today.
Hilltop Fortress - West of Prillarguri hill is another hilltop fortress, protected by a sheer drop on three sides and walls on the fourth side, which was built in the period from 300 to 600 AD.
Ula Dam - In 1877-1879 the Norwegian parliament ordered construction of the Ula Dam to stop gravel and rock transported by the Ula River from blocking the Gudbrandsdalslågen and flooding the fertile valley floor. The debris washed down by the Ula in 1789 destroyed the houses at Selsverket and rerouted the Gudbrandsdalslågen, such that the farms along the Sel became marshes.

In literature and legend 
 Sel is where Kristin Lavransdatter, a fictitious Norwegian woman living in the 14th century, grows up. Kristin Lavransdatter is a trilogy of historical novels written by the 1928 Nobel laureate Sigrid Undset.
 Prillar-Guri or Prillarguri is a semi legendary figure who, according to oral tradition, was a woman from Sel, Norway who played a key role in the Battle of Kringen in August 1612

Notable people 
 Paul Thorsen Harildstad (1764 in Heidal – 1843) a farmer, rep. at the Norwegian Constitutional Assembly at Eidsvoll
 Olav Kringen (1867 in Sel – 1951) a Norwegian newspaper editor and politician; 1887–1897 in USA
 Erling Steineide (1938 in Heidal – 2019) a cross-country skier, participated at the 1964 Winter Olympics
 Hans Ola Sørlie (1953 in Otta – 1988) a Norwegian actor
 Even Aleksander Hagen (born 1988 in Otta) a Norwegian politician, County Mayor of Oppland

Gallery

References

External links

Municipal fact sheet from Statistics Norway 

 
Municipalities of Innlandet
Populated places on the Gudbrandsdalslågen
1908 establishments in Norway